The Refugee Education Council is a Government of Canada advisory body that works to include the voices of refugees in refugee-education programs. 

It was founded in 2021 as part of wider attempts by the Government of Canada to include refugees in decision making. The creation of group has been described by OpenCanada as "promising" and was welcomed by Right to Play. 

In 2022 the group presented a manifesto to further increase inclusion.

Organization 
The council was founded in 2021 as part of a wider package of efforts called Together for Learning. The founding of the council was described by OpenCanada as "promising", and Right to Play welcomed the launch.

Council members include community leaders, parents, teachers, and youth advocates. The group is housed by World Vision Canada and supported by the Canadian International Education Policy Working Group (network of organisations). 

The council exists to increase the participation of refugees in the design and delivery of educational programs.

In March 2022, at the Government of Canada's Together for Learning summit the council presented its manifesto A Vision for the Education of Refugee and Displaced Learners calling for more inclusion of refugees beyond just the group of fifteen members.

Membership

References

External links 

 Official website

2021 establishments in Ontario
Refugee aid organizations in Canada
Organizations based in Ottawa
Organizations based in Ontario